is a Japanese actress.

Biography
Nakagoshi debuted as a model for ViVi magazine in 1999. She began acting the same year, making her acting debut as Midori Sato in the show Tengoku no Kiss. Her acting attracted her great attention and from there, she moved onto bigger roles. Her breakthrough role came in the 2003 NHK asadora, Kokoro, where she played the lead, Kokoro Suenaga. Since then she has acted in many dramas, films, and stage plays.

Since 2014, she has been married to actor Masaru Nagai.

Select filmography

Films
 Strawberry Shortcakes (2006) as Chihiro
 Unholy Women (2006)
 Apartment 1303 (2007)
 Sugata Sanshiro (2007)
 Town of Evening Calm, Country of Cherry Blossoms (2007)
 4 Shimai Tantei Dan (2008)
 Orochi: Blood (2008) as Risa Monzen
 The Lone Scalpel (2010) as Shōko Ōkawa
 Sekigahara (2017) as Hanano
 Roleless (2022)

Television
 Hero (2001, Fuji TV)
 Trick 2 (2002, TV Asahi)
 Kokoro (2003, NHK), Kokoro Suenaga
 Pride (2004, Fuji TV)
 Yoshitsune (2005, NHK), Kenreimon-in Tokuko
 Kishiryu Sentai Ryusoulger (2019, TV Asahi)
 The Sunflower Disappeared in the Rain (2022, Wowow)

References

External links 
 

1979 births
Living people
Japanese actresses
Japanese female models
People from Saga (city)
Asadora lead actors